Philip Caveney (born 1951) is a British children's author, best known for the Sebastian Darke, Alec Devlin and Movie Maniacs novels. He previously wrote a number of thrillers for adults. He was born in Prestatyn, North Wales but for many years lived in Stockport and co-ordinated the Manchester Writers' Workshop for over twenty five years, before moving to Edinburgh.

Sebastian Darke
The Sebastian Darke books are a fantasy series for children. They recount the adventures of Sebastian Darke, a failed jester, and his companions: Max, a talking (and endlessly complaining) "buffalope" (a huge, shaggy beast of burden), and Captain Cornelius Drummel, a tiny but powerful warrior and leading exponent of the lethal Golmiran Death Leap.

The first book in the series, Sebastian Darke: Prince of Fools was published by Random House Children's Books in 2007 and the second, Sebastian Darke: Prince of Pirates, in 2008. A third title, Sebastian Darke: Prince of Explorers was published in 2009 and in 2010, there was a spin-off recounting Max's life story, A Buffalope's Tale. The final part of the story, Sebastian Darke: Prince of Spies, was published in 2012.

Alec Devlin
Alec Devlin: The Eye of the Serpent was published in August 2008 and tells the tale of Alec Devlin, a young archaeologist in 1920s Egypt. The book is a classic adventure novel aimed at the 9+ age group. The sequel Alec Devlin: Empire of the Skull was published in 2009 and the third and final adventure, Maze of Death, was published in 2010.

Movie Maniacs

Night on Terror Island was published in 2011 by Red Fox Books and tells the story of Kip McCall, a young boy whose father owns a cinema, The Paramount Picture Palace. When mysterious new projectionist Mr Lazarus comes to work at the cinema, he brings with him his own invention, The Lazarus Enigma, a device which can put people into movies. When you're in there, everything becomes real. The sequel, Spy Another Day, was published in 2012 and a third book, Space Blasters, was released in May 2013.

The Talent

The Talent is a stand-alone book, only available electronically. Set in a dystopian future Manchester, it tells the story of Josh, who enters a Government sponsored contest - The Talent - in the hope of giving himself a better future. At the audition, he meets Holly and the two of them team up to try and win the competition on what they soon discover, is NOT a level playing field.

Crow Boy

When Tom Afflick visits Mary King's Close in Edinburgh, he expects nothing more than a boring school trip. But after following the ghostly figure of a young girl, he finds himself transported back in time to 1645 - the year of the Edinburgh plague. Apprenticed to a violent plague doctor, he must try to survive in an increasingly hostile world, never knowing if he will ever find his way back to his own time.

Space Blasters

The mysterious Mr Lazarus has helped Kip and his father completely change the fortunes of the small local cinema they own and run - but now Stephanie a local journalist is sniffing around, wanting to know how he's done it . . .
With the launch party for the huge space adventure movie, Space Blasters, approaching, Kip is desperate to keep Stephanie away. But when Mr Lazarus himself ends up stuck inside the film at the mercy of the evil Emperor Zarkan, Kip has no choice. He has to go in after him - to a galaxy far, far away . . .

Watchers

After the death of his father in a car accident a year ago, Will Boone is struggling to come to terms with his life. A chance encounter with a mysterious tramp called Ari, makes things even more baffling. Ari tells Will he has a message for him – from his dead father.

When Will digs deeper he discovers that Ari is a member of a band of new age travellers – The Watchers, a group of fallen angels, cast out of heaven in the 'great war.' They have been sentenced to travel the earth, making up for their past sins by helping mankind. But they are pitched against a second band of angels, led by the dark and sinister Lou, who have devoted themselves to mischief and who have set their sights on adding to their considerable tally of souls by casting Will's father into the deepest pits of hell.

With the help of Ari and the other Watchers, Will must work to prevent this from happening – and the Watchers are able to equip him with some very special skills to help him achieve his aims. But when it comes to the final showdown, can they prevail against the powerful forces of evil?

Animal Factory

When Fred, the elderly sheepdog of Morton's farm has a terrifying dream of being attacked by black ravens, he becomes convinced that a great change is coming. It begins with the arrival of Ralph, an orphaned sheepdog and shortly afterwards, a pregnant female Doberman who gives birth to a litter of puppies, before dying. As the Dobermans grow older, under the leadership of the runt of the litter, Kurt, they begin to exert a powerful influence over the other animals and eventually the human occupants of the farm. After an unfortunate encounter with the farm's chickens, Kurt directs his brothers and sisters to do their best to coop them up and ultimately destroy them. Animal Factory is both a condemnation of mankind's cruelty to animals and a dark allegory about the rise of the Nazi party in the 1940s. It features scenes that younger readers may find disturbing. (Ebook only)

Bibliography

Adult books
 1978 The Sins of Rachel Ellis
 1985 Tiger, Tiger
 1985 The Tarantula Stone
 1993 Speak No Evil
 1993 Black Wolf
 1994 Strip Jack Naked
 1995 Skin Flicks
 1994 Slayground
 1996 Burn Down Easy
 1996 Bad to the Bone
 1997 1999
 2000 Love Bites
 2014 Little Monsters

Children's books
 2007 Sebastian Darke: Prince of Fools
 2008 Sebastian Darke: Prince of Pirates
 2008 Alec Devlin: The Eye of the Serpent
 2009 Sebastian Darke: Prince of Explorers
 2009 Alec Devlin: Empire of the Skull
 2010 Alec Devlin: Maze of Death
 2011 Night on Terror Island
 2012 Sebastian Darke: Prince of Spies
 2012 The Talent
 2012 Spy Another Day
 2012 Crow Boy (Crow Boy Trilogy)
 2013 Watchers
 2013 Animal Factory
 2014 Seventeen Coffins (Crow Boy Trilogy)
 2015 One for Sorrow (Crow Boy Trilogy)
 2016 The Calling
 2017 The Slithers

References

External links

 Philip-Caveney.co.uk Official Philip Caveney site
 Philip Caveney School Visits Philip Caveney Official School Visits site
 SebastianDarke.co.uk Official Sebastian Darke site
 Philip Caveney at House of Legends
 Philip Caveney at Random House Australia
 The Darke Ages Are Coming Philip Caveney's Sebastian Darke blog
 Introducing Alec Devlin Philip Caveney's Alec Devlin blog
 Interview with Caveney 3 Jan 2007 about 'Sebastian Darke': click link in left hand column
 Philip Caveney at Waterstones.com
 

British children's writers
British fantasy writers
British horror writers
20th-century British novelists
21st-century British novelists
1951 births
Living people
British male novelists
People from Prestatyn
20th-century British male writers
21st-century British male writers